The game of Go (Old Chinese: *ɢʷəj grə "surrounding game") originated in China in ancient times.  It was considered one of the four essential arts of a cultured Chinese scholar in antiquity and is described as a worthy pastime for a gentleman in the Analects of Confucius. It reached Korea by the 5th century, in the 7th century it had reached Japan. The game was described by Thomas Hyde in 1694, but it did not become popular in the West until the late 19th century.

According to legend, the game was created as a teaching tool after the ancient Chinese Emperor Yao  (2356–2255 BCE) designed it for his son, Danzhu , to learn discipline, concentration, and balance. Another suggested genesis for the game is that Chinese warlords and generals used pieces of stone to map attacking positions. Other plausible theories relate Go equipment to divination or flood control.

Origin in China 

Go's early history is debated, but there are myths about its existence, one of which assuming that Go was an ancient fortune telling device used by Chinese astrologers to simulate the universe's relationship to an individual.

The earliest written reference of the game is usually taken to be the historical annal Zuo Zhuan, referring to a historical event of 548 BCE. It is also mentioned in Book XVII of the Analects of Confucius and in two of the books of Mencius.

Chinese archaeologists have discovered a broken piece of a pottery go board from the Western Han Dynasty (206 BCE – 24 CE) in Shaanxi Province. This is the earliest discovery of an existing board unearthed in China. The board was found in the ruins of a watchtower at the tombs of Emperor Jingdi and Empress Wang Zhi of the Western Han Dynasty. The broken fragment of the board measures 5.7 cm to 28.5 cm long, 17 cm to 19.7 cm wide and 3.6 cm thick. Li Gang, a research fellow with the Shaanxi Provincial Archaeological Research Institute, said that this board might have been made from a floor tile, and that it did not belong to the royal family since the carvings are too rough.  Li said the board could have been made by the tomb guards who played go to pass the time. "That proves that go was being played not only by nobles, but also by ordinary people like tomb guards, more than 2,000 years ago", Li noted.

In 1954 a complete Go board made out of stone was found in a tomb dating to the Eastern Han dynasty (25–220) in Wangdu County, Hebei Province. This board has a 17 × 17 grid, which confirms the statement by the 3rd century author Handan Chun in the Classic of Arts that Go was at this time played on a 17 × 17 grid:

The go board has 17 lines along its length and breadth, making 289 points in all. The black and white stones each number 150.

The earliest board with a 19 × 19 grid to have been found is a ceramic board dating to the Sui dynasty (581–618) that was excavated from Anyang in Henan Province, so sometime between the 3rd and 6th centuries a change in grid size must have taken place. However, the 17 × 17 board has survived in the version of Go played in Tibet.

The first book dedicated to Go is the Dunhuang Go Manual ( CE), and was found in the Mogao Caves in Dunhuang, and discusses the game as played on a 19 x 19 board. More books devoted to the game were written during the Tang and Song dynasties.

In ancient China, Go was often seen as the refined pastime of the scholars, while xiangqi was the game of the masses. According to Japanese historian Miyoshi, Go flourished in China from about 200 to 600 CE, when the interest in art and literature was at a high point. Go was one of the four cultivated arts of the Chinese scholar gentleman, along with calligraphy, painting and playing the musical instrument guqin, and examinations of skill in those arts was used to qualify candidates for service in the bureaucracy.

Growth in east Asia

Go is believed to have been introduced to Japan by Kibi no Makibi who had studied in Tang China at the beginning of the 8th century. But the Taihō Code, enacted in 701 CE, has a description of Go and therefore the game may have been introduced a little earlier. The approximate period can be confirmed by the Middle Chinese pronunciation 圍棋 *ɦʉi ɡɨ, which was loaned into Old Japanese as *wigə/wigo2 (= man'yōgana 井碁), later becoming the modern Japanese mixed kan-on/go-on reading 囲碁 igo. 

After it was introduced from China, Go came to be actively played during the Nara period (710–794 CE), and during the following Heian period (794–1185 CE) Go was a favourite aristocratic pastime, as is described in typical literary works of this period such as The Pillow Book and The Tale of Genji. 

During the Muromachi period (1336–1573), potentates employed semi-professional Go players, called Go-uchi or Jouzu who competed against other clans. At the end of the 16th century, Nikkai (Hon'inbō Sansa) served Oda Nobunaga, Toyotomi Hideyoshi and Tokugawa Ieyasu as a Go teacher, and in 1578 was recognized as the first Meijin of Go by Oda Nobunaga; he also became the first Hon'inbō. Around this time, free opening of the game started; before, the game started from a set position of several stones on the board.

These four houses (iemoto) competed with each other throughout the 300 years of the Edo period. Professional matches between the four houses, as well as other high profile players, were called oshirogo ("castle Go"), because they were held at castles of the shogun.

The wave of Westernization and modernization accompanying the Meiji Restoration in 1868 caused the dissolution of the official iemoto Go system and a wane in general popularity for the game. In the wake of this upheaval, the Hon'inbō title was transformed into a tournament title.

Development in the West

Despite its widespread popularity in East Asia, Go has been slow to spread to the rest of the world, unlike other games of ancient Asian origin, such as chess. Schädler speculates that chess has more widespread appeal because culturally congruent game pieces can be created in chess (e.g. Queen and Bishop in Western Chess, Advisor and Elephant in Chinese Chess), while Go is totally abstract. Also, there is no climactic ending in Go (such as checkmate in chess). New players often have trouble figuring out when a game of Go is over. Other theories center around the existence of fundamental differences in the level and type of thinking required by Go players as opposed to chess players. While pure analytical thought and the ability to plan many moves in advance are advantageous in chess, in Go a more intuitive approach based on pattern recognition and experience is stressed. A purely analytical approach, due to the sheer number of moves available for consideration, can be paralyzing.

The first detailed description of Go in a European language, De Circumveniendi Ludo Chinensium (About the Chinese encircling game), was written in Latin by Thomas Hyde, and included in his 1694 treatise on Oriental board games, De Ludis Orientalibus (About Oriental games), pp. 195–201; Oskar Korschelt, a German engineer, is credited with being the first person to try to popularize Go outside of East Asia. He learned about the game from Hon'inbō Shūho (Murase Shūho) when he worked in Japan from 1878 to 1886. Korschelt published a detailed article on Go in 1880. A few years later he published a book based on this article. He brought the game to Europe, especially to Germany and Austria, and thus became the first person to systematically describe Go in a Western language. Since he learned Go in Japan, the terms of Go in Western languages come from Japanese, and Westerners generally refer to the game by its Japanese name  instead of its Chinese name .

By the early 20th century, Go had spread throughout the German and Austro-Hungarian empires. In 1905, Edward Lasker learned the game while in Berlin. When he moved to New York, Lasker founded the New York Go Club together with (amongst others) Arthur Smith, who had learned of the game while touring the East and had published the book The Game of Go in 1908. Lasker's book Go and Go-moku (1934) helped spread the game throughout the US, and in 1935, the American Go Association was formed. Two years later, in 1937, the German Go Association was founded. World War II put a stop to most Go activity, but after the war, Go continued to spread.

Western players' interest increased in the 1950s.  In 1978, Manfred Wimmer became the first Westerner to receive a professional player's certificate from an East Asian professional Go association. It was not until 2000 that a Westerner, Michael Redmond, achieved a professional 9 dan rating, the top rank awarded by East Asian Go associations.

For most of the 20th century, the Japan Go Association played a leading role in spreading Go outside East Asia, publishing the English-language magazine Go Review in the 1960s, establishing Go centers in the US, Europe and South America, and often sending professional teachers on tour to Western nations.
By 2005, the European Go Federation had a total of 35 member countries.

In 1996, NASA astronaut Daniel Barry and Japanese astronaut Koichi Wakata became the first people to play Go in space, they used a special Go set designed by Wai-Cheung Willson Chow. Both astronauts were awarded honorary dan ranks by the Nihon Kiin.

In 2016 Lee Sedol was defeated by the computer program AlphaGo.

Trivia
The first recorded game of Go in Europe was played in 1872 between Kido Takayoshi and Ōkubo Toshimichi. Both were vice ambassadors of the Iwakura Mission, which traveled to the United States and Europe between 1871 and 1873. Kido was an enthusiastic Go player, as can be seen from his diary (translated by Sidney DeVere Brown and Akiko Hirota as The Diary of Kido Takayoshi, Vol. I–III, Tokyo, The University of Tokyo Press, 1983–1986). During his journey, after arriving at Birmingham on 1 November 1872 and staying at the Queen's Hotel in Room No. 10, Kido notes two days later in his diary (Vol. II, p. 243):

3 November 1872 [Meiji 5/10/3]  Fair, then rain. I stayed in my room all day to recuperate from my illness, and had a special diet. I played go with Ōkubo.  (Note) Sunday.

See also 

 Go at the 2010 Asian Games
 International Go Federation
 List of professional Go tournaments
 Dunhuang Go Manual
 Classic of Arts

References

Notes 
 
 
 
 
 
 .
 
  Revision of

External links
 History of Go in ancient China, Korea and Japan